Posthuman is a hypothetical future being whose basic capacities so radically exceed those of present humans as to be no longer human by our current standards.

Posthuman may also refer to:
Posthuman (band), a British band
"Posthuman", a 1998 song by Marilyn Manson from Mechanical Animals
Posthuman (Harm's Way album) (2018)
Posthuman (JK Flesh album) (2012)
Posthuman Records, a vanity label founded by Marilyn Manson
Post Human: Survival Horror, a 2020 album by Bring Me the Horizon
"Posthuman", a song by Grand Mixer DXT and Bill Laswell, from their 2003 album Aftermathematics

See also
Posthumanism, postmodern philosophy's reinterpretation of what it means to be a human being
Posthumanization, a process by which a society comes to incorporate members other than human beings